Logan Township is a township in Clinton County, Pennsylvania, United States. The population was 872 at the 2020 census.

History
The Logan Mills Covered Bridge and Logan Mills Gristmill are listed on the National Register of Historic Places.

Geography
Logan Township is located in southern Clinton County and is bordered to the south by Centre County.

Demographics

As of the census of 2000, there were 773 people, 265 households, and 215 families residing in the township.  The population density was 32.2 people per square mile (12.4/km).  There were 338 housing units at an average density of 14.1/sq mi (5.4/km).  The racial makeup of the township was 98.45% White, 0.26% African American, 0.26% Native American, 0.13% Asian, and 0.91% from two or more races. Hispanic or Latino of any race were 1.42% of the population.

There were 265 households, out of which 35.8% had children under the age of 18 living with them, 69.4% were married couples living together, 7.5% had a female householder with no husband present, and 18.5% were non-families. 15.1% of all households were made up of individuals, and 9.1% had someone living alone who was 65 years of age or older.  The average household size was 2.92 and the average family size was 3.20.

In the township the population was spread out, with 28.8% under the age of 18, 9.1% from 18 to 24, 27.0% from 25 to 44, 20.4% from 45 to 64, and 14.6% who were 65 years of age or older.  The median age was 36 years. For every 100 females, there were 100.8 males.  For every 100 females age 18 and over, there were 99.3 males.

The median income for a household in the township was $31,389, and the median income for a family was $34,688. Males had a median income of $28,250 versus $19,167 for females. The per capita income for the township was $13,939.  About 7.1% of families and 11.9% of the population were below the poverty line, including 19.4% of those under age 18 and 1.8% of those age 65 or over.

References

Populated places established in 1775
Townships in Clinton County, Pennsylvania
Townships in Pennsylvania